A UFO convention is a convention about UFOs that usually take place annually at hotels or convention centers. Historically, many would mainly feature contactees giving presentations about their experiences. Other topics, like UFO conspiracy theories, general conspiracy theories, and other paranormal phenomena are often discussed.

Notable conventions

Roswell UFO Festival  4th of July Weekend (Roswell NM)
Alien Con
UFO Congress
Contact In The Desert (Indian Wells CA)
Ozark Mountain UFO Conference (Eureka Springs AR)
UFO MegaCon
UFO Fest (McMinnville, Oregon)
Giant Rock Spacecraft Conventions, held by George Van Tassel and helped pay for the Integratron from the mid-1950s to the mid-1970s near Landers, California
 MUFON International UFO Symposium (1969-present)
 National UFO Conference (1999-present)
 Conspiracy Con, produced by Brian William Hall from 2001-present

In popular culture
 The Lone Gunmen, from the 1994 X-Files episode E.B.E., originate from a UFO convention
 Esteemsters, 1997 Daria episode
 The Convention, 2000 Roswell episode
 Attack of the Saucer Morons, 2001 Invader Zim episode
 Alien Abductions, 2003 Bullshit! episode, features 3 days at a UFO convention
 Resident Alien (TV series), 2021 "Welcome Aliens" episode (Season 1 Episode 9)

References

Bibliography

 
UFO culture